The KT postcode area, also known as the Kingston upon Thames postcode area, is a group of 24 postcode districts in England, within 19 post towns. These cover boroughs in south-west Greater London and several boroughs in north-east Surrey.

Mail for this area is sorted at the Jubilee Mail Centre in Hounslow. In Greater London the area covers most of the Royal Borough of Kingston upon Thames and small parts of the boroughs of Merton, Richmond upon Thames and Sutton, while in Surrey it covers virtually all of the borough of Elmbridge, most of the borough of Epsom and Ewell, the northwestern part of the borough of Reigate and Banstead, the northern part of the Mole Valley district, the northeastern parts of the boroughs of Guildford and Woking and the southern part of the borough of Runnymede, as well as a very small part of the borough of Spelthorne.



Coverage
The approximate coverage of the postcode districts:

! KT1
| KINGSTON UPON THAMES
| Kingston upon Thames, Hampton Wick, part of Norbiton
| Kingston upon Thames, Richmond upon Thames
|-
! KT2
| KINGSTON UPON THAMES
| Kingston upon Thames, Canbury, Coombe, parts of Norbiton and Richmond Park 
| Kingston upon Thames, Richmond upon Thames
|-
! KT3
| NEW MALDEN
| Motspur Park, New Malden, part of Old Malden
| Kingston upon Thames, Merton
|-
! KT4
| WORCESTER PARK
| Worcester Park, Cuddington, part of Old Malden, Stoneleigh
| Epsom and Ewell, Kingston upon Thames, Merton, Sutton
|-
! KT5
| SURBITON
| Berrylands, part of Surbiton, part of Tolworth
| Kingston upon Thames
|-
! KT6
| SURBITON
| Surbiton, Tolworth, part of Long Ditton, Seething Wells
| Elmbridge, Kingston upon Thames
|-
! KT7
| THAMES DITTON
| part of Long Ditton, Thames Ditton, part of Weston Green
| Elmbridge, Kingston upon Thames
|-
! KT8
| EAST MOLESEY; WEST MOLESEY
| East Molesey, West Molesey, Hampton Court Palace and part of its Park; 1.5 Thames islands, part of Bushy Park, Hampton Court neighbourhood, Hampton
| Elmbridge, Richmond upon Thames
|-
! KT9
| CHESSINGTON
| Chessington, Malden Rushett, Hook, part of Long Ditton
| Elmbridge, Kingston upon Thames
|-
! KT10
| ESHER
| Esher, Claygate, Hinchley Wood, part of Weston Green
| Elmbridge
|-
! KT11
| COBHAM
| Cobham, Stoke d'Abernon, Downside, Hatchford, parts of Wisley, Ockham and Hersham
| Elmbridge, Guildford, Mole Valley
|-
! KT12
| WALTON-ON-THAMES
| Walton-on-Thames, Hersham, Whiteley Village
| Elmbridge
|-
! KT13
| WEYBRIDGE
| Weybridge, Oatlands, Saint George's Hill, Hamm Court
| Elmbridge, Runnymede
|-
! KT14
| WEST BYFLEET
| Byfleet, West Byfleet
| Elmbridge, Runnymede, Woking
|-
! KT15
| ADDLESTONE
| Addlestone, New Haw, Woodham
| Runnymede, Woking
|-
! KT16
| CHERTSEY
| Chertsey, Ottershaw, Longcross, Lyne, Dumsey Meadow in Littleton
| Runnymede, Spelthorne
|-
! KT17
| EPSOM
| Epsom, Ewell, Stoneleigh
| Epsom and Ewell, Reigate and Banstead, Sutton
|-
! KT18
| EPSOM
| Epsom, Tattenham Corner, Headley, Langley Vale
| Epsom and Ewell, Mole Valley, Reigate and Banstead
|-
! KT19
| EPSOM
| Epsom, West Ewell, Stoneleigh, Horton, Longmead
| Epsom and Ewell
|-
! KT20
| TADWORTH
| Tadworth, Kingswood, Lower Kingswood, Walton-on-the-Hill, Burgh Heath, Mogador, Box Hill
| Mole Valley, Reigate and Banstead
|-
! KT21
| ASHTEAD
| Ashtead
| Mole Valley
|-
! KT22
| LEATHERHEAD
| Leatherhead, Oxshott, Fetcham
| Elmbridge, Mole Valley
|-
! KT23
| LEATHERHEAD
| Great Bookham, Little Bookham
| Guildford, Mole Valley
|-
! KT24
| LEATHERHEAD
| West Horsley, East Horsley, Effingham
| Guildford, Mole Valley
|}

Map

See also
Postcode Address File
List of postcode areas in the United Kingdom

References

External links
Royal Mail's Postcode Address File
A quick introduction to Royal Mail's Postcode Address File (PAF)

Postcode areas covering London
Postcode areas covering South East England
Media and communications in the Royal Borough of Kingston upon Thames
Media and communications in the London Borough of Sutton
Media and communications in the London Borough of Richmond upon Thames
Epsom and Ewell